Robert Quickenden (14 December 1923 – 28 July 2010) was a football (soccer) player who represented New Zealand at international level.

Quickenden made his full All Whites debut in a 2–0 win over Fiji on 7 September 1952 and ended his international playing career with five A-international caps and two goals to his credit, his final cap an appearance in a 5–3 win over Tahiti on 28 September 1952.

Born in London on 14 December 1923, Quickenden became a naturalised New Zealand citizen in 1975, and died on 28 July 2010.

References 

1923 births
2010 deaths
New Zealand association footballers
New Zealand international footballers
Association football forwards
English emigrants to New Zealand
Naturalised citizens of New Zealand